The 1998 World Weightlifting Championships were held in Lahti, Finland from November 7 to November 15. The men's competition in the middle-heavyweight (94 kg) division was staged on 14 November 1998.

Medalists

Records

Results

References
Results
Weightlifting World Championships Seniors Statistics, Page 17 

1998 World Weightlifting Championships